Elemgasem (after a Tehuelche god of the same name) is an extinct genus of brachyrostran abelisaurid from the Late Cretaceous Portezuelo Formation of Patagonia, Argentina. The genus contains a single species, Elemgasem nubilis. The cladistic position of Elemgasem within Brachyrostra is uncertain, given that  phylogenetic analyses recover it as either a sister taxon to Furileusauria or in several positions within this clade.

Discovery and naming 
The holotype consists of partial axial and appendicular elements, including cervical and caudal vertebrae, right femur, left tibia, right and left fibula, left astragalus-calcaneum, metatarsals, and various pedal phalanges.

In 2022, Baiano et al. described Elemgasem as a new genus and species of brachyrostran abelisaurid. The generic name, "Elemgasem", references a Tehuelche deity of the same name; according to mythology, Elemgasem is the owner of animals and father of the southern viscacha with the power to petrify others and himself, as well as the inhabitant of the mountains and sky. The specific name, "nubilus", means "foggy day" in Latin, in reference to the unusual foggy climate during the expedition that discovered the Elemgasem holotype.

Paleoenvironment 
Elemgasem is known from the Portezuelo Formation of Argentina. Named taxa recovered from the formation include the theropod dinosaurs Megaraptor, Patagonykus, Neuquenraptor, Pamparaptor, and Unenlagia, the sauropod dinosaurs Futalognkosaurus, Malarguesaurus, and Baalsaurus, and the azhdarchoid pterosaur Argentinadraco. Other fossils belonging to ornithopod dinosaurs, neornithines, turtles, and crocodiles have also been found in the formation.

References 

Fossils of Argentina
Cretaceous Argentina
Late Cretaceous dinosaurs of South America
Turonian life
Coniacian life
Brachyrostrans
Fossil taxa described in 2022
Portezuelo Formation